The Office of Dispute Resolution for Acquisition (ODRA) is an Article I court that was established by the Federal Aviation Administration (FAA) pursuant to a statutory grant of authority as an independent tribunal to hear and decide both award protests and contract disputes subject to the Acquisition Management System (AMS) between government contractors and the FAA.

See also
 Federal Aviation Administration
 Acquisition Management System
 Contract Disputes Act of 1978
 Tucker Act
 Civilian Board of Contract Appeals
 United States Court of Federal Claims
 United States Court of Appeals for the Federal Circuit

References

External links
 

Contract
Government procurement in the United States